"Young Boys Are My Weakness" is a 1989 song by Australian singer Kate Ceberano. It was released as her debut solo single in the UK in July 1989, and in Australia as the third single from her third solo album, Brave. It was released in October 1989 on the Festival Records label in Australia and on London Records internationally. The song is a slightly re-worded cover version of The Commodores' 1974 song "Young Girls Are My Weakness", taken from their album Machine Gun.

The song, along with album track "Obsession", was recorded with Phil Harding and Ian Curnow at PWL Studios, with Harding recalling, "for us to work with such a great singer was an unusual treat."

In Australia, it was released as a double A-sided single with "Brave".

It spent fifteen weeks in the top 50 and peaked at No. 15 on the Australian singles chart, and No. 98 in the United Kingdom. This is Ceberano’s only song to make the top 100 in the United Kingdom.

Ceberano now refuses to perform the song, due to its controversial lyrics — feeling her present age now makes it inappropriate.

Track listing

Charts

Weekly charts

References

Kate Ceberano songs
1989 songs
1989 singles
London Records singles
Festival Records singles